This is a list of members of the Western Australian Legislative Council between 22 May 1989 and 21 May 1993. This was the first membership of the Council to be elected under the multi-member electorate system established by the Acts Amendment (Electoral Reform) Act 1987 (No.40 of 1987) where members were selected by proportional representation within six regions.

Notes
 On 10 July 1991, North Metropolitan MLC Reg Davies, elected as a Liberal, left the party and sat as an Independent.
 On 3 March 1992, Agricultural Labor MLC Jim Brown resigned. Labor candidate Kim Chance was appointed to the resulting casual vacancy on 18 March 1992.
 On 13 January 1993, East Metropolitan Labor MLC Kay Hallahan resigned to contest the seat of Armadale at the 1993 election. Labor candidate Valma Ferguson was elected by a countback on 2 February 1993 to fill the vacancy, but was not sworn in.
 On 14 January 1993, South Metropolitan Liberal MLC Phillip Pendal resigned to contest the seat of South Perth at the 1993 election. Liberal candidate Diane Airey was elected by a countback on 2 February 1993 to fill the vacancy, but was not sworn in.

Members of Western Australian parliaments by term